Cattleya granulosa (the "granulose Cattleya") is a bifoliate Cattleya species of orchid. It is endemic to Brazil; the type specimen was reported to come from Guatemala, but this is likely erroneous. The diploid chromosome number of C. granulosa has been determined as 2n = 40.

References

External links

granulosa
granulosa
Endemic orchids of Brazil